is a Japanese actor and voice actor.

He is known for acting in several live action films and known for Japanese voice-dubbing Peter Parker/Spider-Man in Spider-Man: The New Animated Series, as well as dubbing Tobey Maguire's role as Peter Parker/Spider-Man in through the Spider-Man film trilogy as well as in the Japanese-released Spider-Man video games based on the films, and continued to dub Peter Parker/Spider-Man in The Spectacular Spider-Man animated series.

Filmography

Film
Jigyaku no Uta (2007) (Tallow role)

Television
Abarenbō Shōgun (2000) (Episode 19)
Tiger & Dragon (2005) (Meguro Wolf) (Episode 9)
Kōmyō ga Tsuji (2006) (Hosokawa Tadaoki)
Tomica Hero Rescue Fire (2010) (Fukushima)
Segodon (2018) (Kikkawa Kenmotsu)
The 13 Lords of the Shogun (2022) (Anzai Kagemasu)

Television animation
Detective Conan (1996) (Keiichi Naruse)
In the Beginning: The Bible Stories (1997) (Moses (Childhood))
Arc the Land (1999) (Jean)

Games
Lego Marvel Super Heroes (Japanese-dubbed version) (Spider-Man)
Spider-Man (2002 video game) (Japanese-dubbed version) (Peter Parker/Spider-Man)
Spider-Man 2 (Japanese-dubbed version) (Peter Parker/Spider-Man)
Spider-Man 3 (Japanese-dubbed version) (Peter Parker/Spider-Man)

Dubbing

Live-action
500 Days of Summer (Tom Hansen (Joseph Gordon-Levitt))
Band of Brothers (Private John Hall (Andrew Scott))
Broken Arrow  (2002 TV Asahi edition) (Riley Hale Christian Slater))
Catch Me If You Can (Frank William Abagnale, Jr. (Leonardo DiCaprio))
Clockstoppers (Zak Gibbs (Jesse Bradford))
Donnie Darko (Donnie Darko (Jake Gyllenhaal))
Fear and Loathing in Las Vegas (2014 Blu-ray and DVD edition) (The Hitchhiker (Tobey Maguire))
Joint Security Area (Pvt. Chǒng U-jin (Shin Ha-kyun))
Pecker (Matt (Brendan Sexton III))
Pitch Black (William Jones (Cole Hauser))
Saving Private Ryan (Unknown dubbing voice role) (2002, TV Asahi, Sunday Movie Theater edition)
Spider-Man film series
Spider-Man (Peter Parker/Spider-Man (Tobey Maguire))
Spider-Man 2 (Peter Parker/Spider-Man (Tobey Maguire))
Spider-Man 3 (Peter Parker/Spider-Man (Tobey Maguire))
Spider-Man: No Way Home (Peter Parker/Spider-Man (Tobey Maguire))
Star Trek: Nemesis (Shinzon (Tom Hardy))
Star Wars Episode IV: A New Hope (Unknown dubbing voice role) (Nippon TV, Roadshow Friday edition (Special Edition))
The Cider House Rules (Wally Worthington (Paul Rudd))
The Immortal (Goodwin (Steve Braun))
The Nutty Professor (Additional Japanese dubbing voice) (2000 Nippon TV, Roadshow Friday edition)
The Scam (Kang Hyun-soo (Park Yong-ha †))
So Little Time (Larry Slotnick (Jesse Head))
Total Recall (McLean (John Cho))
Trance (Simon (James McAvoy))
Unfaithful (Paul Martel (Olivier Martinez))
The Way of the Gun (Parker (Ryan Phillippe))
Winter Sonata (Kim Sang-hyeok (Park Yong-ha))
Y Tu Mamá También (Tenoch Iturbide (Diego Luna))

Animation
Lilo & Stitch (David Kawena)
Spider-Man: The New Animated Series (Peter Parker/Spider-Man)
The Spectacular Spider-Man (Peter Parker/Spider-Man)

External links

References

1972 births
Living people
Male voice actors from Mie Prefecture
Actors from Mie Prefecture
Japanese male film actors
Japanese male television actors
Japanese male voice actors